Farar is a Pakistani television film directed by Mehreen Jabbar. It starred Marina Khan, Sania Saeed and Huma Nawab in leading roles. The film first broadcast on Pakistan Television Corporation in 1996, and later on Indus Vision. The film entails the journey of three friends from Karachi as they try to navigate love and their city.

Plot 

The telefilm revolves around three friends who are different from each other but are misfit in their respective places. Amber, a divorcee who lives with her mother and tries to earn some money to go abroad. She keeps working on different plans again and again but gets nothing. Natasha, lives in Amber house as her family is settled in London and works in an office. She loves Ali (who is already married) since her college days, who was his class-fellow then, and now his colleague. Tania, lives with her parents and often wants escape from her house as her parents are not happy with her artistic nature. She is fond of music and learns Kathak.

In her Kathak class, Tania gets impresse by Asad, a new guy in the class who is not shy about his hobbies. After days, they become familiar to each other and share a great bond as they are similar in nature. Tania decides to marry him  but her parents are not willing for it just because of his love of dance.

Amber, who wants escape from her city due to her unpleasant memories for which she requires a money, tries different businesses including carpet selling and real estate but gets deceive everytime.

She along with Tania tries to explain Natasha that she is being used by Ali just for time pass but she doesn't care it due to fear of losing him. Ali too spends time with her and leads her on but didn't do any commitment about their relationship. Due to the pressure of her friends, Natasha one day questions him about her position in his life upon which he tries to satisfy her. She then realises herself after noticing him with his wife in a restaurant on the occasion of his marriage anniversary.

Tania's parents want Asad to give up his passion of Kathak to marry their daughter but she denies him to do so because she wants him to continue his passion.

Natasha decideds to go London to her family, and her friends go to drop her at airport where Tania syas her to comeback in Pakistan at her wedding and Amber tells them about her next plan of animal farming.

Cast 

 Marina Khan as Natasha
 Sania Saeed as Tania
 Huma Nawab as Amber
 Humayun Saeed as Asad
 Shabbir Jan as Ali
 Badar Khalil as Amber's mother
 Jahanara Hai as Tania's mother
 Dawood Nawaz as Tania's father
 Fasih Ur Rehman as himself

Remake 

In April 2022, it revelaed that Jabbar has directed a web-series based on telefilm, and will be released on ZEE5. The web-series features Sarwat Gillani, Mariam Saleem and Maha Hassan in leading roles.

Reception

Critical reception 
The telefilm is often praised due to its feminist approach and unconventional female characters.

A reviewer from The Nation praised the writer's approach to present the classical dance respectfully.

References 

1990s Pakistani television series
Pakistan Television Corporation original programming
Urdu-language television shows
Pakistani drama television series